Mitchell High School may refer to:

In Australia:
Mitchell High School (New South Wales), Blacktown, New South Wales

In the United Kingdom:
Mitchell High School (Stoke-on-Trent), Bucknall, Stoke-on-Trent

In the United States:
General William Mitchell High School, Colorado Springs, Colorado
J. W. Mitchell High School, New Port Richey, Florida
Mitchell High School (Indiana), Mitchell, Indiana
Mitchell High School (Nebraska), Mitchell, Nebraska
Mitchell High School (North Carolina), Bakersfield, North Carolina
Mitchell School, Mitchell, Oregon
Mitchell High School (South Dakota), Mitchell, South Dakota
Mitchell High School (Tennessee), Memphis, Tennessee